Connally Independent School District is a public school district based in the northernmost part of Waco, Texas (USA).

In addition to a small portion of north Waco, Connally ISD serves most of the city of Lacy-Lakeview, the community of Elm Mott, and parts of Bellmead.

History
The district was formed in 1950–51 by the merger of the Lakeview and Elm Mott school districts. The name comes from the former James Connally Air Force Base in the district (now the flagship campus of the Texas State Technical College System) and carries over to the school mascot, the Cadet.

After the resumption of classes in fall 2021 during the COVID-19 pandemic, two teachers at the junior high school died of COVID-19 by September 1, 2021; the district canceled classes for two days and reopened after Labor Day with a mask mandate, one of several smaller school districts to join urban districts in requiring masks.

Schools
Connally High School (Grades 9-12)
Connally Junior High School (Grades 6-8)
Connally Elementary School (Grades 4&5)
Connally Primary School (Grades 1-3)
Connally Early Childhood Center (Grades Pre-Kindergarten–Kindergarten)

References

External links
Connally ISD

School districts in McLennan County, Texas